Acanthodactylus blanci, commonly known as the white fringe-fingered lizard or Blanc's fringe-toed lizard, is a species of lizard in the family Lacertidae. The species is endemic to North Africa.

Etymology
The specific name, blanci, is in honor of a "M[onsieur] Blanc " of Tunis who collected the holotype specimen.

Geographic range
Acanthodactylus blanci is found in Algeria and Tunisia.

Description

Reproduction
A. blanci is oviparous.

Habitat
The natural habitats of A. blanci are temperate forests, Mediterranean-type shrubby vegetation, sandy shores, and plantations.

Conservation status
A. blanci is threatened by habitat loss.

References

Further reading
Doumergue F (1901). Essai sur la faune erpétologique de l'Oranie avec des tableaux analytiques et des notations pour la détermination de tous les reptiles et batraciens du Maroc, de l'Algérie et de la Tunisie. Oran: L. Fouque. 104 pp. + Plates I-XXVII. (Acanthodactylus blanci, new species, pp. 184–186 + Plate XIII, Figures 1–5). (in French).
Salvador A (1982). "A revision of the lizards of the genus Acanthodactylus (Sauria: Lacertidae)". Bonner Zoologische Monographien (16): 1–167. (Acanthodactylus blanci, pp. 69–73, Figures 30–32, Map 13).

blanci
Lacertid lizards of Africa
Reptiles of North Africa
Reptiles described in 1901
Taxa named by François Doumergue
Taxonomy articles created by Polbot